Robert, Bob Cameron or Rob Cameron may refer to:

 Robert Cameron (British politician) (1825–1913), Liberal Member of Parliament for Houghton-le-Spring, 1895–1913
 Robert Cameron (cricketer) (born 1938), Australian cricketer
 Robert Cameron (New South Wales politician) (1890–1970), New South Wales politician
 Robert Cameron (photographer) (1912–2009), American photographer
 Robert Cameron (Queen's Park footballer) (fl. 1909–1911), Scottish footballer
 Robert Cameron (Lincoln City footballer) (fl. 1892–1893), Scottish footballer
 Robert Alexander Cameron (1828–1894), American soldier during the American Civil War
 Robert Curry Cameron (1925–1972), American astronomer
 Robert Horton Cameron (1908–1989), American mathematician
 Robert Macfarlane Cameron (1860–1920), Scottish architect
 Robert Parke Cameron (1920–2012), former Canadian ambassador to Romania
 Robert Shaw Cameron (born 1976), British actor and director
 Bob Cameron (Australian footballer) (1877–1960), Australian rules footballer
 Bob Cameron (Canadian football) (born 1954), Canadian Football League punter
 Bob Cameron (Victorian politician) (born 1963), Australian state politician
 Bobby Cameron (footballer, born 1932), Scottish footballer with QPR
 Bobby Cameron (goalkeeper), Scottish footballer for Queen's Park
 Rob Cameron, Australian rugby player

See also 
 Cameron (surname)